Anileridine (trade name: Leritine) is a synthetic analgesic drug and is a member of the piperidine class of analgesic agents developed by Merck & Co. in the 1950s. It differs from pethidine (meperidine) in that the N-methyl group of meperidine is replaced by an N-aminophenethyl group, which increases its analgesic activity.

Anileridine is no longer manufactured in the US or Canada.  Anileridine is in Schedule II of the Controlled Substances Act 1970 of the United States as ACSCN 9020 with a zero aggregate manufacturing quota as of 2014.  The free base conversion ratio for salts includes 0.83 for the dihydrochloride and 0.73 for the phosphate.  It is also under international control per UN treaties.

Administration
As tablets or injection.

Pharmacokinetics
Anileridine usually takes effect within 15 minutes of either oral or intravenous administration, and lasts 2–3 hours.  It is mostly metabolized by the liver.

References

4-Phenylpiperidines
Phenethylamines
Synthetic opioids
General anesthetics
Anilines
Ethyl esters
Mu-opioid receptor agonists
Analgesics